Brloška Dubrava is a village in Otočac municipality in Lika-Senj County, Croatia with zip code area 53226.Brloška Dubrava . The village is settled on geographic Latitude: 44°55'53.04" and Longitude: 15°11'2.04". The most know place in this area is Pećina Krču.

References

Populated places in Lika-Senj County